Steel Gauntlet is the third novel of the military science fiction StarFist Saga by American writers David Sherman and Dan Cragg.

In Steel Gauntlet, St. Cyr, a maniacal sadist who has reinvented the doctrine of armored warfare has taken control of the planet Diamunde, and 34th FIST is deployed as part of a larger force in a full-scale war to remove him from power. The Marines are to make an opposed landing, establish a "planethead" and hold for relief by the army. These Marines are going to have to fight tanks, something nobody has trained to do in several centuries.  And beside the tactical and strategic problems presented by the armor, the overall commander of the Confederation force is a political admiral with a talent for making bad choices. The 34th FIST will have its hands full on this mission, and heavy casualties are certain.

1999 science fiction novels
StarFist series
1999 novels
Del Rey books